Jason M. Fields (born January 29, 1974) is an American politician, and a former stockbroker, financial advisor, and banker from Milwaukee, Wisconsin. He was a Democratic member of the Wisconsin State Assembly for six terms (2005–2013 & 2017–2021).  Fields ran for Milwaukee City Comptroller, the city's top financial job, in the 2020 spring election, but lost narrowly.

Background 
Jason Fields was born in Milwaukee on January 29, 1974, to Johnie Fields Jr and Debra Fields. He graduated from Milwaukee Lutheran High School in 1992. He worked as a stockbroker, financial advisor, and banker, and is a certified financial education instructor. He returned to school as an adult, earning his Bachelor's degree in Business Management from Milwaukee's Cardinal Stritch University in 2014.  He is a member of the Prince Hall Masons, the Alpha Phi Alpha fraternity, the Independent Order of Odd Fellows, the Elks Lodge of Milwaukee #46, and the International Society of Business Leaders.

Public office 
Fields, who had served as Fourth Congressional District Chairman of the Wisconsin Democratic Party and held other party office, was first elected to the Assembly in 2004, and was thrice reelected from 2006-2010). His committee assignments included those on financial institutions (which he chaired during the 2009-2011 session);  insurance; jobs, economy and small business, education reform; transportation; ways and means, workforce development, economic development; and urban and local affairs.

2012 Primary Defeat 
In 2012, he lost his bid for reelection in the Democratic primary, losing to Mandela Barnes, son of a public school teacher, who had made major issues of Fields's support for the school voucher program, and Fields’s opposition to limiting interest rates charged by payday loan companies whose charges can exceed a 500% annual percentage rate. (Fields's brother Jarett, who was a candidate for the Democratic nomination in the nearby 19th District, was also defeated.) Fields was one of two veteran Milwaukee-area Democratic incumbents (the other being Peggy Krusick) to be unseated in that August primary by challengers who argued that the incumbent was too conservative to represent the district properly.

2016 Return 
In 2016, Barnes announced he would challenge incumbent Lena Taylor in a Democratic primary for her seat in the Wisconsin State Senate.  This left an opening in the 11th Assembly District, and Fields decided to run again for his old seat.  He defeated Milwaukee community organizer Darrol D. Gibson in the Democratic primary and was unopposed in the general election.

2020 Comptroller election 
In 2020, Fields announced he would run for election as Milwaukee City Comptroller.  He topped the field in the February primary election, taking 43% of the vote, but was narrowly defeated in the general election by deputy comptroller Aycha Sawa.  Fields made an issue of Sawa's handling of an audit of lead piping which was rated as exaggerated and misleading.  The comptroller election was one of several Wisconsin elections significantly impacted by the 2020 COVID-19 pandemic in Wisconsin.

Leaving office
On May 12, 2020, Fields filed paperwork with the Wisconsin Elections Commission declaring he would not be a candidate for re-election in 2020.  He also released a press release confirming the decision, stating, "After much consideration about the future, and conversations with my dear wife, La Tasha Fields, I have decided to not seek re-election to the Wisconsin State Assembly, District 11."

Electoral history

Wisconsin Assembly (2004, 2006, 2008, 2010)

| colspan="6" style="text-align:center;background-color: #e9e9e9;"| Democratic Primary Election, September 14, 2004

| colspan="6" style="text-align:center;background-color: #e9e9e9;"| General Election, November 2, 2004

| colspan="6" style="text-align:center;background-color: #e9e9e9;"| General Election, November 7, 2006

| colspan="6" style="text-align:center;background-color: #e9e9e9;"| General Election, November 4, 2008

| colspan="6" style="text-align:center;background-color: #e9e9e9;"| General Election, November 2, 2010

Wisconsin Assembly (2012)

| colspan="6" style="text-align:center;background-color: #e9e9e9;"| Democratic Primary Election, August 14, 2012

| colspan="6" style="text-align:center;background-color: #e9e9e9;"| General Election, November 6, 2012

Wisconsin Assembly (2016, 2018)

| colspan="6" style="text-align:center;background-color: #e9e9e9;"| Democratic Primary Election, August 9, 2016

| colspan="6" style="text-align:center;background-color: #e9e9e9;"| General Election, November 8, 2016

| colspan="6" style="text-align:center;background-color: #e9e9e9;"| General Election, November 6, 2018

Milwaukee Comptroller (2020)

| colspan="6" style="text-align:center;background-color: #e9e9e9;"| Primary Election, February 18, 2020

| colspan="6" style="text-align:center;background-color: #e9e9e9;"| General Election, April 7, 2020

References

External links
 Representative Jason Fields at Wisconsin Legislature (Official page)
 Fields for Milwaukee (Campaign site) (Archived version)
 
 
 Follow the Money - Jason M Fields
2008 2006 2004 campaign contributions
Campaign 2008 campaign contributions at Wisconsin Democracy Campaign

1974 births
Living people
Politicians from Milwaukee
Cardinal Stritch University alumni
Democratic Party members of the Wisconsin State Assembly
21st-century American politicians
African-American state legislators in Wisconsin
American Prince Hall Freemasons
21st-century African-American politicians
20th-century African-American people